Seclin is a commune in the Nord department in northern France. It is part of the Métropole Européenne de Lille.

Population

Notable residents

Andre Ayew, Ghana national football team footballer 
Victor Mollet, architect
Jonathan Rousselle, basketball player
Steeven Willems, Footballer

International relations

Seclin is twinned with:
 Apolda, Germany
 Larkhall, Scotland, United Kingdom
 Meguet, Burkina Faso
 Zabrze, Poland

See also
Communes of the Nord department

References

Communes of Nord (French department)
French Flanders